John Spaull (born 20 August 1977) is an Australian rules footballer who played for North Melbourne in 2000 and 2001.

He was drafted in the 1999 Pre-season Draft with the 11th selection from the Rosebud Football Club in the Mornington Peninsula Nepean Football League.  He played eight games in two seasons at the Kangaroos before he was delisted at the end of the 2001 season.

References

External links

Living people
1977 births
North Melbourne Football Club players
Australian rules footballers from Victoria (Australia)